The Russian First League 1997 was the 6th edition of the Russian First Division.

Overview

Standings

Top goalscorers 

29 goals

 Aleksei Chernov (FC Lada-Grad Dimitrovgrad)

23 goals

 Valeri Solyanik (FC CSK-VVS Kristall Smolensk)

18 goals

 Marat Mulashev (FC Irtysh Omsk)

17 goals

 Rustyam Fakhrutdinov (FC Neftekhimik Nizhnekamsk)
  Ibragim Gasanbekov (FC Anzhi Makhachkala)
  Aleksandrs Jelisejevs (FC Metallurg Lipetsk)
 Oleg Nechayev (FC Lada-Grad Dimitrovgrad)

15 goals

 Igor Menshchikov (FC Metallurg Lipetsk)
 Valeri Shushlyakov (FC Kuban Krasnodar)
  Narvik Sirkhayev (FC Anzhi Makhachkala)

See also
1997 Russian Top League
1997 Russian Second League
1997 Russian Third League

2
Russian First League seasons
Russia
Russia